Lintuvaara (Finnish) or Fågelberga (Swedish) is a district of Espoo, a city in Finland.

Located by a forest, Lintuvaara is known as a quiet suburban area with most of the buildings there being either low density row houses or detached homes. The Leppävaara centre, a major traffic hub and the home to the Sello mall, is only a couple of kilometres to the south from Lintuvaara. Due to the close proximity of services and schools as well as sporting opportunities, Lintuvaara is known as a very kid-friendly neighbourhood and it has thus attracted many families to live there.

See also 
 Districts of Espoo

References 

Districts of Espoo